Deewangi is Pakistani romantic drama television series, produced by Abdullah Kadwani and Asad Qureshi under 7th Sky Entertainment. It has Danish Taimoor and Hiba Bukhari in their second project together after Haara Dil.

Plot 
The story revolves around Nageen (Hiba Bukhari), who hails from a lower-middle-class background, and Sultan Durrani (Danish Taimoor), a wealthy businessman who hails from a political background. Sultan lost his parents at a very young age and lived with his grandmother Bi Jaan (Ismat Zaidi) ever since. Nageen lives with her sister Nuzhat (Faiza Gillani), brother-in-law Rashid (Noor-ul-Hassan) and Rashid's mother. Nageen only lands menial jobs because she does not have a degree, and is hired as a bus hostess at a private bus company.

Sultan crosses paths with Nageen when his car suddenly stops working on the highway and has no other choice but travel in a bus. In that brief journey, Sultan is drawn to Nageen when he sees her confronting a harasser. Afterwards, he starts travelling by bus every now and then just to meet Nageen but she ignores him and only treats him as a passenger. To seek her attention, Sultan buys all the bus tickets one day to travel alone with Nageen. He expresses his feelings for her but she rejects him because of their class difference. She gets more frightened after a man throws acid on Faryal (Nageen's friend) for refusing his proposal. On the other hand, Sultan's cousin, Narmeen (Zoya Nasir), who wants to marry Sultan, finds out about Nageen and makes a plan to trap her. After a few days, Sultan forcefully tries to put a ring on Nageen's fingers but she refuses and slaps him. Narmeen's secret agent records a video and it goes viral on social media. The video makes Sultan look like a harasser and as a result, his uncle loses general public elections. Nageen reaches out to Sultan for his forgiveness and he accepts her apology. Sultan again proposes to Nageen and she accepts it this time. Nageen's family is very happy with the marriage, but most members of Sultan's family oppose it as they want him to marry Narmeen. On the wedding day, Nageen is kidnapped and every one suspects her of running away with someone else. Sultan calls off the wedding and Nageen's character is questioned in the society.

Nageen is let go after two days. Her family believes that she has either been raped or ran away on her own wish. Nageen tries to assure them that nothing bad happened with her nor she ran away. She has no explanation to give concerning the two-day kidnapping. After a few days, Nageen goes to Sultan to make him believe of her innocence, but Sultan reveals that he was the one who kidnapped her and that the marriage was just a plan to seek revenge from Nageen for the slap and the public humiliation. Nageen is heartbroken. She threatens to expose Sultan in front of the media but Sultan blackmails Nageen with photoshopped intimate pictures. He also pays Rashid (brother-in-law) 50 Lac Rupees to keep their mouth shut.

Sultan marries Narmeen on Bi Jaan's insistence. Rashid forcefully arranges Nageen's marriage with Anwar but Nageen plans to runaway with the help of her sister. One day, Anwar comes to Nageen's house when she is alone and tries to rape her so Nageen, out of self-defense, grabs the first hard thing she sees, hits him on the head, and escapes. Nageen goes to Lahore to her Aunt's house. On the way, Nageen meets Haroon (Ali Abbas) who tries to become her friend but she turns him down. Haroon helps Nageen a lot in Lahore. Nageen lands a job as a Receptionist in a TV Channel company. She finds out that Haroon also works as a reporter in the same company. They become friends and Haroon starts liking Nageen. Sultan leads an unhappy married life with Narmeen and missed Nageen constantly but tries to deny his feelings. In Lahore, Haroon proposes Nageen but she is reluctant as Haroon's mother doesn't approve of the match. However, Nageen and Haroon manage to get married anyway. On the other hand, Sultan begins his search for Nageen. One day, Sultan finds out about Narmeen's conspiracies and in a fit of rage, he throws Narmeen out of the house. However, Narmeen hits a wall and dies after giving birth to their daughter. Sultan and Bijaan hide it from everyone but Bijaan is angry at Sultan and doesn't let's him meet his daughter. Eventually Narmeen's father gets to know about it. Narmeen's father tries to shoot Sultan, but accidentally shoots Bi Jaan and she dies. Narmeen's parents cut all ties with Sultan and doesn't allow him to meet his daughter Rameen. Thus Sultan loses all his loved ones and temporarily shifts to UK.

Four years pass by. Nageen leads a happy married life with Haroon although they have financial issues, they also have trouble while having a baby and Haroon's mother constantly taunts Nageen. Sultan returns to Pakistan and tries to meet his daughter, but Narmeen's mother doesn't allow him. Sultan still loves Nageen. One day, Sultan sees Nageen and again becomes obsessed with her.
Sultan started stalking Nageen and in order to get closer to her, appoints Haroon in his company. Sultan provided a furnished house to Haroon's family in Karachi so that they can shift to Karachi and he can get close to Nageen more often. Sultan strengthen his ties with Haroon's family but Nageen keeps on trying to avoid him. After realizing that all his efforts are useless, Sultan hired Haroon's ex, Ramsha in his company and conspires with her to make hurdles in Nageen's life. Ramsha got close to Haroon and started manipulating him against Nageen. Ramsha was also suspicious about the obsession of Sultan with Nageen, after digging in Nageen's past she gets to know the affair of Sultan and Nageen. On the other hand, Nageen tried to save his marriage by telling Haroon truth about her past with Sultan. Haroon in fit of rage confront Sultan and try to hit him but his servants attacked Haroon and made his injuries look like an accident. Ramsha realizes that Sultan is dangerous and selfish person so she partnered with Nageen in order to punish Sultan legally. However, Ramsha ended up committing suicide. Nageen claimed that Ramsha is murdered by Sultan but cops said she died by shooting herself.

In order to expose Sultan, Nageen agreed to marry him and ask Sultan to provide money for treatment of Haroon. However, during nikah Nageen neglect to marry Sultan and creates a scene in front of media, infuriating Sultan. He took Nageen to his home where during an argument Nageen shot him. Haroon took the blame of shooting Sultan and was locked up by cops. Sultan was taken to hospital, where he asked cops to release Haroon and that he has shot himself. Haroon's mother accept Nageen as her daughter-in-law. Nageen and Haroon ended up together while Sultan dying in the hospital.

Cast

Main Cast
Danish Taimoor as Sultan Durrani; Narmeen's husband. Nageen's Ex Lover
Hiba Bukhari as Nageen Faiyyaz; Haroon's wife. Sultan's Ex

Recurring Cast
Zoya Nasir as Narmeen; Sultan's cousin and later on wife 
Ali Abbas as Haroon Malik; Nageen's husband 
Ismat Zaidi as Bi Jaan 
Mehmood Aslam as Muzaddid Durrani; Narmeen's father and Sultan's paternal uncle
Faiza Gillani as Nuzhat; Nageen's elder sister
Parveen Akbar as Nuzhat's mother-in-law
Noor Ul Hasan as Rashid; Nageen's brother-in-law
Nida Mumtaz as Sharmin; Narmeen's mother
Humaira Bano as Haroon's mother
Aiza Awan as Ridha; Haroon's sister
Anas Ali Imran as Fawad; Sultan's friend
Fahima Awan as Faryal; Nageen's colleague
Salma Shaheen as Faryal's mother
Zohreh Ali as Ramsha; Haroon's ex-girlfriend

Soundtrack

The OST is sung and composed by Sahir Ali Bagga on lyrics penned by Imran Raza. It had gained 1.3M views in 2 weeks on YouTube after release and become trended all over Pakistan in 2020. The OST gains positive reaction and has garnered 42 million views on YouTube as of January 2022 since its release.

Broadcast
The serial started airing on Geo TV from 18 August 2019. The drama was retelecast on Geo TV from 28 September 2021.

Awards and nominations
Deewangi has been successfully able to sweep major nominations at Lux Style Awards and Pakistan International Screen Awards in 2021.

Controversy 
After the terror incident on Pakistan Stock Exchange in July 2020, the attackers car was found in the later episode of the series, sparked reaction from audiences due to the strange coincidence.

References

External links 

2019 Pakistani television series debuts
Pakistani television series
Urdu-language television shows
Geo TV original programming